Kranti is a 2002 Indian action drama film directed by Naresh Malhotra. It stars Vinod Khanna, Bobby Deol Ameesha Patel, Rati Agnihotri and Kabir Bedi.

Plot
The film is about an honest cop, Abhay Pratap Singh and his father Awadesh Pratap Singh. Abhay defies conventional methods to nab criminals and for this reason, has frequent arguments with his father. Sanjana enters in Abhay's life as a student who is writing a thesis on an honest cop. She falls in love with Abhay and follows him everywhere. This lands her in trouble as she gets shot by a criminal whom Abhay is pursuing. She survives but Abhay tracks the mastermind behind the criminal, Mahendra Singh Rana. Rana is a wealthy industrialist who has ties with politicians and tries to slow down Abhay in his chase. He takes advantage of Abhay's confrontations with his father and sets up father against his son. However, Awadesh soon realizes Rana's tricks and reconciles with Abhay. Abhay manages to kill Rana and restore peace in the city.

Cast 

 Vinod Khanna as Police Commissioner Awadesh Pratap Singh
 Bobby Deol as Assistant Commissioner of Police Officer Abhay Pratap Singh
 Ameesha Patel as Sanjana Roy 
 Rati Agnihotri as Sushma Singh
 Kabir Bedi as Mahendra Singh Rana
 Pallavi Kulkarni as Anu Singh
 Dalip Tahil as Home Minister Sharatchandra Aghase
 Arun Bakshi as Labour Minister Pachpute
 Yunus Parvez as Chief Minister
 Madan Jain as Inspector Pawar
 Om Puri as Colonel Krishnakant (Special Appearance)
 Gavin Packard as Shiva   
 Dinyar Contractor as Judge, who meets Awdesh Pratap Singh in morning while jogging 
 Syed Badr-ul Hasan Khan Bahadur as Mr. Mehra
 Veeru Krishnan as Police Inspector Ghorpade 
 Tiku Talsania as Police Inspector Lele
 Jeetu Verma
 Dinesh Hingoo as Retail Store Owner
 Tej Sapru as John
 Raj Zutshi as Terrorist
 Shiva Rindani as Zafardari
 Rana Jung Bahadur as Sher Singh

Soundtrack
The songs are written by Anand Bakshi, while the songs are composed by Jatin–Lalit, The soundtrack is available on Universal Music India.

References

External links

2000s Hindi-language films
2002 films
Films scored by Jatin–Lalit
Indian action drama films
Law enforcement in fiction
2002 action drama films